Bernard Peter Wright (born 17 September 1952), nicknamed Bernie the Bolt, is an English former footballer. A tough centre-forward, he scored 78 goals in 320 league games in a nine-year career in the Football League.

A youth player at Birmingham City, he joined Paget Rangers of the Midland Combination, before having a successful trial at Walsall in 1971. He moved on to Everton in 1972. After one season with the "Toffees" he moved back to Walsall. In 1976, he transferred to Bradford City, winning promotion out of the Fourth Division in 1976–77, before signing for Port Vale two years later for a £9,000 fee. In 1980, he went into non-league football with Kidderminster Harriers, later playing for Trowbridge Town, Cheltenham Town, Worcester City, and Gloucester City.

Career
Born in Birmingham, Wright was a youth-team player at Birmingham City, before he played for Paget Rangers of the Midland Combination after being released from St Andrew's in 1971. He returned to the professional game at Third Division Walsall under Bill Moore. He was then signed by Harry Catterick's Everton, after impressing in an FA Cup clash between Everton and Walsall at Goodison Park on 5 February 1972. However, he only played eleven First Division games for the club, scoring two goals, before having his contract terminated for 'serious misconduct' after a training ground incident. He had punched coach Stewart Imlach after he had overlooked Wright for a first team spot. Though he only enjoyed an eleven-month stay with the club, he created an impression on the Everton fans, who remember him for using his head to accidentally break the toe of Sheffield United centre-back Eddie Colquhoun during an attempted diving header.

Wright returned to Walsall in 1973 for a fee of £10,000, and scored 38 goals in 152 league games during his four years at Fellows Park. After struggling in the lower half of the table in 1972–73 and 1973–74 under John Smith and then Ronnie Allen, the "Saddlers" came close to promotion in 1974–75 and 1975–76 under Doug Fraser's stewardship. He joined Bobby Kennedy's Bradford City in 1976, where he scored 13 goals in 66 league games. Bradford won promotion out of the Fourth Division in 1976–77, but suffered relegation in 1977–78 under John Napier. Wright and Don Hutchins were joint-top scorer in 1977–78 with ten goals.

In June 1978, Dennis Butler's Port Vale paid the "Bantams" £9,000 to secure Wright's services; Vale had been relegated along with Bradford the previous season. Wright scored on his debut, a 1–1 draw at Chester in a League Cup game on 16 August 1978. Nine days later the tough striker endeared himself to "Valiants" fans when he scored a hat-trick past local rivals Crewe Alexandra at Gresty Road. He finished as top scorer in the 1978–79 season with 15 strikes in 48 games, and was voted Player of the Year for this achievement. Wright stated that he was always seen as a provider of goals at his previous clubs whereas Butler saw him as a goalscorer. However he lost his place under caretaker-manager Alan Bloor, though regained it with a brace against Northampton Town. He went on to record 9 goals in 33 games in 1979–80, but fell out with new manager John McGrath, and dropped out of the Football League at the end of the season, joining Kidderminster Harriers of the Southern Football League on a free transfer. He later played for Trowbridge Town, Cheltenham Town, Worcester City and Gloucester City.

Style of play
Wright was a strong and tough centre-forward whose long hair and beard combination helped to intimidate opposition defenders. He had a reputation as a 'hard man'.

Post-retirement
Wright later became a forklift truck supervisor and part-time referee in the Central Warwickshire Sunday Leagues.

Career statistics
Source:

Honours
Bradford City
Football League Fourth Division fourth-place promotion: 1976–77

References

Footballers from Birmingham, West Midlands
Association football forwards
English footballers
Birmingham City F.C. players
Paget Rangers F.C. players
Walsall F.C. players
Everton F.C. players
Bradford City A.F.C. players
Port Vale F.C. players
Kidderminster Harriers F.C. players
Trowbridge Town F.C. players
Cheltenham Town F.C. players
Worcester City F.C. players
Gloucester City A.F.C. players
English Football League players
Southern Football League players
English football referees
1952 births
Living people